The Battle of Sagami Bay was a World War II anti-shipping raid off the tip of Bōsō Peninsula on the night of 22 July 1945. It was the last surface action of the war. Destroyer Squadron 61 (DesRon 61) of the U.S Navy engaged with a Japanese convoy consisting of two freighters escorted by subchaser No. 42 and minesweeper No.1. The Japanese escorts were not damaged.

References

Bob Culver Our Ship's Diary As Told By The Crew: Uss Samuel N. Moore Dd-747, Iuniverse Inc, 2004, 

Japan campaign
1945 in Japan
Pacific Ocean theatre of World War II
Naval battles of World War II involving Japan
Naval battles of World War II involving the United States
July 1945 events in Asia